Matrin-3 is a protein that in humans is encoded by the MATR3 gene.

Function 

The protein encoded by this gene is localized in the nuclear matrix. It may play a role in transcription or may interact with other nuclear matrix proteins to form the internal fibrogranular network. Two transcript variants encoding the same protein have been identified for this gene.

Pathology 

Mutations in the Matrin 3 gene are associated with familial amyotrophic lateral sclerosis.

References

Further reading